B'z The Best XXV 1988-1998 is a compilation album by the Japanese hard rock duo B'z. It was released on June 12, 2013, simultaneously with B'z The Best XXV 1999-2012, and it is part of their 25th anniversary celebration. It reached #1 at Oricon charts and Billboard Japan Top Albums.

The album's track list is composed of singles released by the band between 1988 and 1998 with two previously unreleased tracks: "Heat", a collaborative song with the South Korean pop singer Kim Hyun-joong, who once named B'z as his favorite Japanese musical act, and Kakushin, which is used as the opening theme of NTV's drama Kumo no Kaidan (雲の階段).

A special edition copy of the album is also available. It includes a bonus DVD with all of the band's music videos for their first decade, most of which are available on DVD for the first time.

Track listing

Disc 1 
  - 3:49
  - 3:46
 "Lady-Go-Round" - 4:22
 "Be There" - 4:14
  - 4:10
 "Easy Come, Easy Go!" - 4:40
  - 6:13
 "Lady Navigation" - 6:09
 "Alone" - 6:21
 "Blowin'" - 3:56
 "Zero"
  - 3:56
  - 4:27
 "Don't Leave Me"

Disc 2 
 "Motel" - 4:23
  - 3:30
 "Love Me, I Love You" - 3:18
 "Love Phantom" - 4:40
  - 4:29
 "Move" - 3:47
 "Real Thing Shakes" - 4:11
 "Fireball" - 4:14
 "Calling" - 5:56
 "Liar! Liar!" - 3:21
  - 4:07
 "Home" - 4:20
 "Heat" (Kim Hyun-joong cover)

Certifications

References

External links
Album at B'z official website

B'z compilation albums
2013 compilation albums